"Get in the Car" is a single by Echo & the Bunnymen which was released in 1999. It was the second single to be released from their 1999 album,  What Are You Going to Do with Your Life?.

Released by London Records as a CD single, it contains two versions of the title track, the album version and a radio edit, as well as live versions of "Bedbugs and Ballyhoo" and "Rescue". The title track was written by Will Sergeant and Ian McCulloch.

Track listings
"Get in the Car" (radio edit) (Will Sergeant, Ian McCulloch) – 3:05
"Bedbugs and Ballyhoo" (live) (Sergeant, McCulloch, Les Pattinson, Pete de Freitas)
"Rescue" (live) (Sergeant, McCulloch, Pattinson, de Freitas)
"Get in the Car" (Sergeant, McCulloch) – 4:22

References

External links
Lyrics at MTV.com

1999 singles
Echo & the Bunnymen songs
Songs written by Ian McCulloch (singer)
Songs written by Will Sergeant
1999 songs
London Records singles